Clonmel Island is a sand island in Corner Inlet, in the Gippsland region of Victoria, Australia. Clonmel Island lies within the Nooramunga Marine and Coastal Park and is part of a complex of barrier islands that protect a large marine embayment from the pounding waves of Bass Strait.

History
The island is named after the paddle steamer PS Clonmel which was wrecked in the Port Albert Entrance to Corner Inlet, immediately east of the island, in 1841.

References

Islands of Victoria (Australia)
Gippsland (region)